Volcanology (also spelled vulcanology) is the study of volcanoes, lava, magma and related geological, geophysical and geochemical phenomena (volcanism).   The term volcanology is derived from the Latin word vulcan.  Vulcan was the ancient Roman god of fire.

A volcanologist is a geologist who studies the eruptive activity and formation of volcanoes and their current and historic eruptions. Volcanologists frequently visit volcanoes, especially active ones, to observe volcanic eruptions, collect eruptive products including tephra (such as ash or pumice), rock and lava samples. One major focus of enquiry is the prediction of eruptions; there is currently no accurate way to do this, but predicting eruptions, like predicting earthquakes, could save many lives.

Modern volcanology 

In 1841, the first volcanological observatory, the Vesuvius Observatory, was founded in the Kingdom of the Two Sicilies.

Seismic observations are made using seismographs deployed near volcanic areas, watching out for increased seismicity during volcanic events, in particular looking for long period harmonic tremors, which signal magma movement through volcanic conduits.

Surface deformation monitoring includes the use of geodetic techniques such as leveling, tilt, strain, angle and distance measurements through tiltmeters, total stations and EDMs. This also includes GNSS observations and InSAR. Surface deformation indicates magma upwelling: increased magma supply produces bulges in the volcanic center's surface.

Gas emissions may be monitored with equipment including portable ultra-violet spectrometers (COSPEC, now superseded by the miniDOAS), which analyzes the presence of volcanic gases such as sulfur dioxide; or by infra-red spectroscopy (FTIR). Increased gas emissions, and more particularly changes in gas compositions, may signal an impending volcanic eruption.

Temperature changes are monitored using thermometers and observing changes in thermal properties of volcanic lakes and vents, which may indicate  upcoming activity.

Satellites are widely used to monitor volcanoes, as they allow a large area to be monitored easily.  They can measure the spread of an ash plume, such as the one from Eyjafjallajökull's 2010 eruption, as well as SO2 emissions.  InSAR and thermal imaging can monitor large, scarcely populated areas where it would be too expensive to maintain instruments on the ground.

Other geophysical techniques (electrical, gravity and magnetic observations) include monitoring fluctuations and sudden change in resistivity, gravity anomalies or magnetic anomaly patterns that may indicate volcano-induced faulting and magma upwelling.

Stratigraphic analyses includes analyzing tephra and lava deposits and dating these to give volcano eruption patterns, with estimated cycles of intense activity and size of eruptions.

History 
Volcanology has an extensive history. The earliest known recording of a volcanic eruption may be on a wall painting dated to about 7,000 BCE found at the Neolithic site at Çatal Höyük in Anatolia, Turkey. This painting has been interpreted as a depiction of an erupting volcano, with a cluster of houses below shows a twin peaked volcano in eruption, with a town at its base (though archaeologists now question this interpretation). The volcano may be either Hasan Dağ, or its smaller neighbour, Melendiz Dağ.

Greco-Roman philosophy  

The classical world of Greece and the early Roman Empire explained volcanoes as sites of various gods. Greeks considered that Hephaestus, the god of fire, sat below the volcano Etna, forging the weapons of Zeus. The Greek word used to describe volcanoes was etna, or hiera, after Heracles, the son of Zeus. The Roman poet Virgil, in interpreting the Greek mythos, held that the giant  Enceladus was buried beneath Etna by the goddess Athena as punishment for rebellion against the gods; the mountain's rumblings were his tormented cries, the flames his breath and the tremors his railing against the bars of his prison. Enceladus' brother Mimas was buried beneath Vesuvius by Hephaestus, and the blood of other defeated giants welled up in the Phlegrean Fields surrounding Vesuvius.

The Greek philosopher Empedocles (c. 490-430 BCE) saw the world divided into four elemental forces, of Earth, Air, Fire and Water. Volcanoes, Empedocles maintained, were the manifestation of Elemental Fire.  Plato contended that channels of hot and cold waters flow in inexhaustible quantities through subterranean rivers. In the depths of the earth snakes a vast river of fire, the Pyriphlegethon, which feeds all the world's volcanoes. Aristotle considered underground fire as the result of "the...friction of the wind when it plunges into narrow passages."

Wind played a key role in volcano explanations until the 16th century. Lucretius, a Roman philosopher, claimed Etna was completely hollow and the fires of the underground driven by a fierce wind circulating near sea level. Ovid believed that the flame was fed from "fatty foods" and eruptions stopped when the food ran out. Vitruvius contended that sulfur, alum and bitumen fed the deep fires. Observations by Pliny the Elder noted the presence of earthquakes preceded an eruption; he died in the eruption of Vesuvius in 79 CE while investigating it at Stabiae. His nephew, Pliny the Younger, gave detailed descriptions of the eruption in which his uncle died, attributing his death to the effects of toxic gases. Such eruptions have been named Plinian in honour of the two authors.

Renaissance observations 

Nuées ardentes were described from the Azores in 1580. Georgius Agricola argued the rays of the sun, as later proposed by Descartes had nothing to do with volcanoes. Agricola believed vapor under pressure caused eruptions of 'mointain oil' and basalt.

Jesuit Athanasius Kircher (1602–1680) witnessed eruptions of Mount Etna and Stromboli, then visited the crater of Vesuvius and published his view of an Earth with a central fire connected to numerous others caused by the burning of sulfur, bitumen and coal.

Johannes Kepler considered volcanoes as conduits for the tears and excrement of the Earth, voiding bitumen, tar and sulfur. Descartes, pronouncing that God had created the Earth in an instant, declared he had done so in three layers; the fiery depths, a layer of water, and the air. Volcanoes, he said, were formed where the rays of the sun pierced the earth.

Science wrestled with the ideas of the combustion of pyrite with water, that rock was solidified bitumen, and with notions of rock being formed from water (Neptunism). Of the volcanoes then known, all were near the water, hence the action of the sea upon the land was used to explain volcanism.

Interaction with religion and mythology 

Tribal legends of volcanoes abound from the Pacific Ring of Fire and the Americas, usually invoking the forces of the supernatural or the divine to explain the violent outbursts of volcanoes. Taranaki and Tongariro, according to Māori mythology, were lovers who fell in love with Pihanga, and a spiteful jealous fight ensued. Māori will not to this day live between Tongariro and Taranaki for fear of the dispute flaring up again.

In the Hawaiian religion, Pele ( Pel-a) is the goddess of volcanoes and a popular figure in Hawaiian mythology. Pele was used for various scientific terms as for Pele's hair, Pele's tears, and Limu o Pele (Pele's seaweed). A volcano on the Jovian moon Io is also named Pele.

Saint Agatha is patron saint of Catania, close to mount Etna, and an important highly venerated (till today) example of virgin martyrs of Christian antiquity. In 253 CE, one year after her violent death, the stilling of an eruption of Mt. Etna was attributed to her intercession. Catania was however nearly completely destroyed by the eruption of Mt. Etna in 1169, and over 15,000 of its inhabitants died. Nevertheless, the saint was invoked again for the 1669 Etna eruption and, for an outbreak that was endangering the town of Nicolosi in 1886. The way the saint is invoked and dealt with in Italian folk religion, in a quid pro quo manner, or bargaining approach which is sometimes used in prayerful interactions with saints, has been related (in the tradition of James Frazer) to earlier pagan beliefs and practices.

In 1660 the eruption of Vesuvius rained twinned pyroxene crystals and ash upon the nearby villages. The crystals resembled the crucifix and this was interpreted as the work of Saint Januarius. In Naples, the relics of St Januarius are paraded through town at every major eruption of Vesuvius. The register of these processions and the 1779 and 1794 diary of Father Antonio Piaggio allowed British diplomat and amateur naturalist Sir William Hamilton to provide a detailed chronology and description of Vesuvius' eruptions.

Notable volcanologists

Plato (428–348 BC)
Pliny the Elder (23–79 AD)
Pliny the Younger (61 – )
George-Louis Leclerc, Comte de Buffon (1707–1788)
James Hutton (1726–1797)
Déodat Gratet de Dolomieu (1750–1801)
George Julius Poulett Scrope (1797–1876)
Giuseppe Mercalli (1850–1914)
Thomas Jaggar (1871–1953), founder of the Hawaiian Volcano Observatory
Haroun Tazieff (1914–1998), advisor to the French Government and Jacques Cousteau
George P. L. Walker (1926–2005), pioneering volcanologist who transformed the subject into a quantitative science
Haraldur Sigurdsson (born 1939), Icelandic volcanologist and geochemist
Katia and Maurice Krafft (1942–1991 and 1946–1991, respectively), died at Mount Unzen in Japan, 1991
David A. Johnston (1949–1980), killed during the 1980 eruption of Mount St. Helens
Harry Glicken (1958–1991), died at Mount Unzen in Japan, 1991

Gallery

See also

Global Volcanism Program
GNS Science (formerly the Institute of Geological and Nuclear Sciences) (in New Zealand)
Igneous rock
Important publications in volcanology
Kiyoo Mogi, developer of the Mogi model of volcano deformation
Tephrochronology
Volcano
Volcano Number
Volcanism

References

External links
 European Volcanological Society
 United States Geological Survey- Volcanic Hazards Program
 Volcano Live- What is a volcanologist?
 
 World Organization of Volcano Observatories
  and 

 
Earth sciences